Shut It Down may refer to:
 Shut It Down (album), a 2003 album by American death metal band Animosity
 Shut It Down (EP), a 2017 EP by American Christian hip hop artist Rawsrvnt
 "Shut It Down" (song), a 2009 song by American rapper Pitbull
 "Shut It Down", a 2010 song by Drake from Thank Me Later

See also
Shut 'Em Down (disambiguation)